The 1990 Clásica de San Sebastián was the 10th edition of the Clásica de San Sebastián cycle race and was held on 11 August 1990. The race started and finished in San Sebastián. The race was won by Miguel Induráin of the Banesto team.

General classification

References

1990
1990 in Spanish road cycling
1990 UCI Road World Cup
August 1990 sports events in Europe